Greencross is Australia's largest pet care company. The company is privately owned by TPG Capital after an acquisition in 2019.

History
Greencross was founded in 1994 by veterinarian Glen Richards. While practicing companion animal medicine and surgery in Townsville, he purchased Currajong veterinary hospital. This was the start of Greencross.

The company expanded by purchasing and consolidating veterinary services through Australia and went public on the Australian Securities Exchange in 2007, becoming the first veterinary practice in Australia to do so.

One of its largest acquisitions took place in 2014 with the purchase of Mammoth Pet Holdings, the parent of Petbarn and Animates chains in Australia and New Zealand.

References

External links
Official Website
Healpup Website

Pet stores
Pets in Australia
Retail companies of Australia
1994 establishments in Australia
Retail companies established in 1994
Companies listed on the Australian Securities Exchange